"I'm Doin' Me" is a song performed by American singer Fantasia from her third studio album, Back to Me. The song was released on September 28, 2010 serving as the second single from the album.

Critical reception
Ken Capobianco of The Boston Globe described the song as an "insistent declaration of self" that "is more about love in all its incarnations: passionate, regretful, angry, and tender" while Melinda of RnB Music Blog described Fantasia's vocal performance as "wonderful" despite calling the song "pretty average".
Trent of That Grape Juice reviewed the song more positively, calling it a "brilliant" "motivational track" which makes "a bold statement about self-worth" and is "brought to life by Fantasia’s soulful conviction and clever vocal arrangements".

Promotion

Live performances
Fantasia performed the song live on Lopez Tonight on August 26, 2010, BET's 106 & Park on September 8, 2010, Regis & Kelly on September 9, 2010 and on The Wendy Williams Show on September 10, 2010.

Music video
The music video for the single was directed by Benny Boom and was reportedly shot on October 8–9 suggested by a "Behind The Scenes" video which was released on October. The video premiered on Vevo.com November 3. In the video, Fantasia catches her boyfriend with another girl, but rather than making a scene she starts a dance party with her girls and the whole restaurant joins in. Her optimistic attitude takes to the streets and the local park as she croons the importance of taking care of number one, herself.

Charts
"I'm Doin' Me" debuted at number 97 on the U.S. Billboard Hot R&B/Hip-Hop Songs chart so far peaking at number 11 after spending 17 weeks on the chart. It also peaked at number 60 on the U.S. Billboard Radio Songs chart. It has sold 29,000 copies in the U.S.

Year-end charts

References

2010 singles
Fantasia Barrino songs
Songs written by Claude Kelly
Music videos directed by Benny Boom
Songs written by Chuck Harmony
Song recordings produced by Chuck Harmony
J Records singles
2010 songs